Thelymitra albiflora, commonly called the white sun orchid, is a species of orchid that is endemic to South Australia. It has a single erect, narrow, fleshy leaf and up to ten relatively small white flowers with white toothbrush-like tufts on top of the anther.

Description
The lobe on the top of the anther is gently curved forwards and reddish brown with a thin purplish band and a yellow tip. The side lobes curve upwards and have long, toothbrush-like tufts of white hairs covering their tops. The flowers only open on warm to hot sunny days and then only slowly. Flowering occurs from September to November.

Taxonomy and naming
Thelymitra albiflora was first formally described in 2004 by Jeff Jeanes from a specimen collected in the Spring Gully Conservation Park and the description was published in Muelleria. The specific epithet (albiflora) means "pale-flowered".

Distribution and habitat
The white sun orchid grows in the higher rainfall areas of South Australia in heath, forest and woodland.

References

External links
 

albiflora
Endemic orchids of Australia
Orchids of South Australia
Plants described in 2004